Transit is a mobile app providing real-time public transit data. The app functions in over 175 metropolitan areas around the world. Transit was designed for aggregating and mapping real-time public transit data, crowdsourcing user data to determine the true location of buses and trains. Transit was first released in 2012 for iPhone and soon after launched the Android-compatible version. It offers users schedules and alerts for multiple modes of transportation where available, including bus and rail. Transit was developed in Montreal, Quebec, Canada by Sam Vermette and Guillaume Campagna. This app is meant to minimize the need for individuals to own vehicles in cities. Transit is in direct competition with other transit mapping services such as Moovit and Citymapper, as well as general mapping services that also provide transit data such as Google Maps, Bing Maps, and Apple Maps.

Current Transit app executives are Chief Executive Officer Sam Vermette and Chief Business Officer David Block-Schachter.

In 2020, Transit became the official Big Blue Bus (BBB) app for travel planning and information on arriving in real-time buses.

Features 
Transit is compatible with car-sharing and ride-hailing apps such as Uber, Lyft, Via, and Ola, along with multiple bike-share systems. In April 2018, the app expanded to include scooter-sharing systems in four American cities. The app provides users with a color-coded system that matches colors with modes of transportation in order for users to quickly associate a color with the mode of transportation they are monitoring.

In February 2019, the Transit app released an update that allows users to look up bus and train schedules for their whole city even without a data connection, or determine if a bike-sharing station has bikes available. Even when users are offline, they are able to find the nearest public transport stops and map their journey.

Supported Regions  
Transit is supported in 16 countries across the globe including Argentina, Australia, Canada, France, Germany, Iceland, Italy, New Zealand, Sweden, the United Kingdom, and the United States. Within the United States, Transit can be used in 270 regions.

Partners 
Transit supports multiple mobile ticketing platforms including Token Transit and Masabi. Users are only required to input their payment information into the app one time, and then able to purchase ride and bike-share passes within the app's interface. Transit has been endorsed by multiple cities' Transportation Authorities including the MBTA, Metro, MDOT, and the Edmonton Transit System.

Endorsers 
Transit has partnered with public agencies around the world to become their official or endorsed multimodal app. Agencies that have endorsed the app include:

 Boston's Massachusetts Bay Transportation Authority (MBTA)
 British Columbia's BC Transit
 Columbus, Ohio's Central Ohio Transit Authority (COTA)
 Gatineau's Société de transport de l'Outaouais (STO)
 Halifax Transit
 Los Angeles Metro (Metro)
 Maryland Transit Administration (MTA)
 Montreal's Société de transport de Montréal (STM)
 Santa Clara, California's Valley Transportation Authority (VTA)
 Tampa Bay's Pinellas Suncoast Transit Authority (PTSA)
 Vancouver's TransLink

Investors 
In 2018, Transit raised $17.5 million. The majority of investments came from auto manufacturers. The lead investor was Alliance Ventures. Others included Jaguar Land Rover's venture capital fund, InMotion Ventures, Accel, and Real Ventures.

References

Crowdsourcing
Mobile route-planning software
Software companies of Canada
Companies based in Montreal
IOS software
WatchOS software
Android (operating system) software